European route E 442 is part of the international E-road network.

Route 
 
 E48, E49 Karlovy Vary
 E55 Teplice
 E65 Turnov
 E67 Hradec Králové
 E462 Olomouc
 
 E50, E75 Žilina

External links
 Map of E-road
 International E-road network

442
E442
E442